(also known under its American brand name SquareSoft) was a Japanese video game development studio and publisher. It was founded in 1986 by Masafumi Miyamoto, who spun off part of his father's electronics company Den-Yu-Sha. Among its early employees were Hironobu Sakaguchi, Hiromichi Tanaka, Akitoshi Kawazu, Koichi Ishii, Kazuko Shibuya, Nasir Gebelli and Nobuo Uematsu. After several other projects, all of these employees would work on Final Fantasy, a 1987 game for the Nintendo Entertainment System which would bring commercial and critical success and launch a franchise of the same name. Later notable staff included Yoshinori Kitase, Takashi Tokita, Tetsuya Nomura, Yoko Shimomura and Yasumi Matsuno.

Initially developing for PCs, then exclusively for Nintendo systems, Square broke with Nintendo in the 1990s to develop for Sony's in-development PlayStation. Their first PlayStation project, Final Fantasy VII, was a worldwide success, going on to sell ten million units, earning critical acclaim, and boosting the popularity of its genre and platform. Alongside the Final Fantasy series, the company developed or published several other notable series, including SaGa, Mana, Front Mission, Chrono, and Kingdom Hearts.

In the early 2000s, the company saw financial troubles due to the commercial failure of the feature film Final Fantasy: The Spirits Within, which ultimately led Sakaguchi, the creator of Final Fantasy, to withdraw from active game production and leave the company in 2003. Prior to this, a merger had been discussed with Enix, the noted publisher of the Dragon Quest series. Following a delay due to the failure of The Spirits Within, the merger went ahead on April 1, 2003, with the new company taking on the name Square Enix.

Square as a developer and publisher has become famous in the gaming industry, with Final Fantasy ranking as one of the best-selling and best-known role-playing video game series of all time. Several of their games have also marked commercial milestones in gaming for various platforms, and continue to be lauded as classics. Many of Square's staff who left the company at various points founded other studios, including Monolith Soft (Xeno), Sacnoth (Shadow Hearts), Mistwalker (Terra Battle) and AlphaDream (Mario & Luigi).

History

Origins
Square was initially established in September 1983 as a software subsidiary of electric power conglomerate Den-Yu-Sha, a company led by Kuniichi Miyamoto. His son Masafumi Miyamoto, then a part-time employee of the Science and Technology Department at Keio University, had little interest in following his father into the electricity business. After considering different career paths, Miyamoto eventually decided on computer software development at the Yokohama branch of Den-Yu-Sha in Hiyoshi, with a focus on the emerging video game market. Their original offices were based in a former hairdresser's salon. The company's name referred to a golfing term, and represented its aim to face challenges head-on. It also referenced a town square, emphasizing a production environment based on cooperation.

At the time, video games in Japan were usually created by a single programmer. Miyamoto, on the other hand, believed that graphic designers, programmers, and professional story writers would be needed to keep up with the increasingly complex video game development process fuelled by rapid advancements in computing. During these early years, the group was compared to a family business; one of the early hires, Shinichiro Kajitani, joined because he was a friend of Miyamoto, and later compared the company at that time to a "college club". To recruit for this new organizational structure, Miyamoto opened an Internet café-like salon in Yokohama and offered jobs to those who demonstrated exceptional programming skills. Among those hired through this method were Hironobu Sakaguchi and Hiromichi Tanaka, who originally worked there part-time during their university studies, and Hisashi Suzuki, who would go on to become Square's CEO. Miyamoto's initial plan was to recruit from Keio University, but this never materialized.

1985–1987: First games, Final Fantasy

Square's first attempt at a game, and Sakaguchi's first project, was an adaptation of the television game show Torin-ingen. As Miyamoto had not secured the license to adapt it, the show's producers forced Square to cancel the game, prompting its team to be reshuffled. Square's first completed game was The Death Trap (1984) for NEC PC-8801, which was also the first title published under the Square brand. Its sequel, Will: The Death Trap II, was released the following year, and was a commercial success. Many of Square's early titles were produced for PC devices, and focused on the action genre. Two other successes from the period were Rad Racer and The 3-D Battles of WorldRunner.

In 1985, the company completed a licensing agreement with Nintendo to develop titles for the Famicom (Nintendo Entertainment System). A noted reason for the shift to Famicom development was its more stable hardware compared to PCs, which were constantly undergoing changes to their components and requiring adjustments for different set-ups. Square's first Famicom release was a port of Thexder (1985), and its first original game was King's Knight (1986). During this period, the team also hired new developers Akitoshi Kawazu and Koichi Ishii, artist Kazuko Shibuya, American programmer Nasir Gebelli, and composer Nobuo Uematsu. Yusuke Hirata joined that year as sales manager, and later became the company's publicity manager.

In April 1986, Square moved into new offices based in Ginza, noted as one of the most expensive areas for companies to work in; Sakaguchi later speculated Miyamoto was hoping to attract business by appearing affluent. Square was officially founded as an independent company in September of that year with capital of ¥10 million. Sakaguchi was appointed as a Director of Planning and Development, and Hisashi Suzuki became one of the company's directors. Due to the high cost of Ginza rents, the company was forced to move into smaller offices in Okachimachi, Taitō. Square supported Nintendo's Famicom Disk System, though few of the games created for it were major successes and Square was soon struggling financially. Miyamoto brought together the company's four directors and asked for game proposals the staff would later vote on. Sakaguchi wanted to develop a role-playing video game (RPG), a proposal that had been made feasible due to the production and success of Dragon Quest from Enix.

While sceptical, Miyamoto allowed production of the game on the condition it only had a five-person team. Sakaguchi led development, bringing in Gebelli, Kawazu, Ishii, and Uematsu. Production of the game, eventually called Final Fantasy, proceeded in "fits and starts". Sakaguchi eventually received help from the other team at Square led by Tanaka, which included Shibuya and newcomer debugger Hiroyuki Ito. Production on the game lasted roughly ten months. While shipments of 200,000 units were planned, Sakaguchi persuaded Square to double that number. Final Fantasy was a commercial success, selling over 400,000 copies in Japan.

1987–1995: Expansion and notable staff
The success of Final Fantasy prompted development of Final Fantasy II in 1988, which established many of the series recurring elements. This and four more Final Fantasy titles would appear on the Famicom and Super Nintendo Entertainment System (Super Famicom), culminating in Final Fantasy VI in 1994. These and all other projects at Square were developed for Nintendo consoles, including the portable Game Boy. In 1990, Square moved its offices to the Akasaka district, and then to Ebisu, Shibuya in 1992. In April 1991, Square merged with an identically-named dormant company in order to change its share prices. As a result of the merger, Square's foundation was backdated to the other company's July 1966 founding date.

At that time, Square drew some of its development funding from loans from Shikoku Bank. Due to the increasing costs of development, the bank sent Tomoyuki Takechi on secondment to be their office manager in 1990. Takechi's secondment lasted until 1994, by which time Square had annual sales worth ¥16 million per year, and he had become inspired by Sakaguchi's vision for the company. In August of that year, Square registered with the Japan Securities Dealers Association to offer shares for public purchase. Sakaguchi was by now a prominent figure within the company, and was promoted to Executive President in 1991. His increasing corporate involvement lessened his creative input, prompting him to give greater influence to director Yoshinori Kitase. Gebelli left Square in 1993, retiring on royalties from the Final Fantasy series. Miyamoto stepped down as Square's President in 1991 while remaining a major shareholder, and was replaced by Tetsuo Mizuno. In 1991, Suzuki became Vice President.

Besides Final Fantasy, other projects were produced which spawned their own series. Kawazu helmed an RPG project for the Game Boy. Released in 1989, Makai Toushi SaGa (The Final Fantasy Legend) spawned the SaGa series, which Kawazu would continue to be involved over the years. After the release of Final Fantasy III (1990), Ishii was offered the chance to create his own game, leading to the production of Seiken Densetsu: Final Fantasy Gaiden (Final Fantasy Adventure) for the Game Boy in 1991. Ishii went on to develop additional Seiken Densetsu titles, released outside of Japan as the Mana series. A lesser-known series was the Japan-exclusive real-time strategy series Hanjuku Hero, which began in 1988 and focused on parodying conventions of the RPG genre. The company also developed several notable standalone titles including Chrono Trigger, born from a collaboration between Sakaguchi, Dragon Quest creator Yuji Horii, and Dragon Ball artist Akira Toriyama; Super Mario RPG, produced in collaboration with Nintendo using characters from the Mario franchise; and the Western-exclusive Secret of Evermore. Speaking in 2001, Sakaguchi noted that while Final Fantasy was the company's most recognized property, Square's cultivation of several other series meant that it did not have to rely on Final Fantasy to be profitable.

Additional staff joined Square by the 1990s, inspired by the successful Final Fantasy series; the most notable included Kitase, Tetsuya Nomura, Tetsuya Takahashi, and Kaori Tanaka. Their first work for Square was on Final Fantasy IV (1991), which was also designer Takashi Tokita's first project as a full-time employee, and Hiroyuki Ito's first as game designer. Also joining the company was Chihiro Fujioka, who worked on several projects including co-directing Super Mario RPG; Kenichi Nishi, who worked in minor roles on Chrono Trigger and Super Mario RPG; artist Yusuke Naora, who first worked on Final Fantasy VI; Kazushige Nojima, known for his work on the Glory of Heracles series; and Motomu Toriyama, who at the time had no experience with game development and worked as a scenario writer. The music staff of Square also expanded, with four more composers being hired between 1990 and 1993. They were Kenji Ito, who contributed to both the SaGa and Mana series; Hiroki Kikuta, who worked on both the Mana series and standalone projects; Yasunori Mitsuda, who would become famous for his work on the Chrono series; and Yoko Shimomura, who was previously a composer for Capcom. In 1995, Square moved its headquarters to the Shimomeguro district in Meguro.

1995–2000: Move to PlayStation, The Spirits Within

Following the release of Final Fantasy VI and Chrono Trigger, Square staff began planning the next entry in the Final Fantasy series, and entered the emerging 3D gaming market. A combination of hardware limitations, Nintendo's decision to continue using cartridge games over a CD format for the Nintendo 64, and rising cartridge prices prompted Square to move the in-production Final Fantasy VII and their other ongoing projects onto Sony's PlayStation. This shift caused a long-standing rift between Square and Nintendo; one Square employee recalled Nintendo telling the company to "never come back". Square's final Super Famicom release was Sting Entertainments Treasure Hunter G, and their first PlayStation release was Tobal No. 1 from DreamFactory, both in 1996. A licensing agreement with Sony was signed in 1996, which stated that Sony would publish Square's next six games. Among the staff that worked on Final Fantasy VII were Kitase as director, Naora as art director, Nomura as a lead artist, and Nojima as scenario writer. Released worldwide in 1997, Final Fantasy VII was a massive commercial and critical success, going on to sell ten million units worldwide and bringing Square international fame. Also in 1997, at Square's invitation, Takechi returned and took Mizuno's place as President.

Four new hires during the period were Shinji Hashimoto, Yasumi Matsuno, Hitoshi Sakimoto, and Masashi Hamauzu. Hashimoto joined in 1995 as promotions producer for Final Fantasy VII. Matsuno, along with a number of other developers, had left Quest Corporation following the release of Tactics Ogre (1995), and worked with Sakaguchi on Final Fantasy Tactics (1997). Sakimoto came on board with Matsuno, and worked on the music for his games. Hamauzu joined in 1996, and worked on Final Fantasy spin-off titles and the SaGa series. Sakaguchi, working on other projects, took on the role of executive producer for the series beginning with Final Fantasy VIII, and Hashimoto stepped in as producer. Hirata, after holding an administrative position during the Nintendo years, became a game production lead, focusing on introducing new genres into Square's library.

Several properties were created or renewed during this period. These included Parasite Eve, based on a novel of the same name by Hideaki Sena; Front Mission, which began on the Super Famicom but was transferred to the PlayStation beginning with its second entry; and the Final Fantasy spin-off series Chocobo, starring an incarnation of the titular mascot character. During the mid-1990s, Square launched an initiative to give teams of younger staff members a chance to create experimental titles on smaller budgets. Among such titles were Xenogears, Soukaigi, and Another Mind. Also during the mid-to-late 1990s, several staff members departed Square due to creative differences or a desire to work on their own projects. These included Takahashi and Tanaka, Fujioka, Nishi, Kikuta, Mitsuda, and Mana artist Shinichi Kameoka. In April 2000, Suzuki was appointed Square's new President, while Takechi became a company chairman. Also at this time, two outside directors were appointed, Kenichi Ohmae of Ohmae & Associates and Makoto Naruke of Microsoft. The corporate reshuffle was intended to strengthen Square's overseas connections and bring in technical and administrative support for future digital and online content. Alongside this, Yoichi Wada joined the company as a company director and eventually COO. In August 2000, Square was listed on Tokyo Stock Exchange's first section, which includes the largest companies on the exchange.

While their relations with Nintendo remained poor, Square supported other platforms including the WonderSwan and Windows. Support for the PlayStation continued late into its lifecycle with multiple releases including Threads of Fate (1999) and Vagrant Story (2000). The company also began work on PlayOnline, a platform to host the company's online store and web content as well as online services for their games. Sakaguchi was mostly based in Hawaii by this point; in addition to leading production on Final Fantasy IX (2000), he also worked at the 1997-established Square Pictures studio on a feature film based on the Final Fantasy series. Called Final Fantasy: The Spirits Within, it was planned as Sakaguchi's first push towards cross-media storytelling; however, the project ran over budget and ended up costing Square and co-producer Columbia Pictures US$137 million. During this period, Sakaguchi also created the concept for Final Fantasy XI, the company's first MMORPG, developed by the Chrono team and led by Ishii.

2001–2003: Final years, merger
Upon its release in 2001, The Spirits Within was met with mixed critical reception, and grossed only $85 million. Labelled as a box-office bomb, the film damaged Square's finances, and led to the closing of Square Pictures. Following both the failure of The Spirits Within and a delay to Final Fantasy X (2001) for the PlayStation 2, Square suffered a financial loss for the first time, prompting Sakaguchi, Takechi, and director Masatsugu Hiramatsu to resign from their positions. Sakaguchi was kept on as executive producer for Final Fantasy, while Takechi and Hiramatsu were retained as external consultants. This period left Sakaguchi in a state of low morale. In late 2001, Suzuki stepped down as President, and was replaced by Wada. Yosuke Matsuda became Senior Vice President. Ito also left during this period to work as a freelance composer.

Following its financial losses, Square agreed to sell Sony a 19% stake in the company. Due to their still precarious financial situation and the softening console rivalry between Sony and Nintendo with the release of Microsoft's Xbox, Square successfully reached out to Nintendo to begin development for their hardware again. Square began development on Final Fantasy Crystal Chronicles for the GameCube in late 2001. Under Wada, the company underwent restructuring with the intent of streamlining production and resources, and cutting development costs to increase profits. It also began production on a direct sequel to Final Fantasy X, titled Final Fantasy X-2 (2003); this broke with the common approach under Sakaguchi, who disliked direct sequels. Final Fantasy X-2 was Sakaguchi's last credited project at Square, and he left the company in 2003. Another project in development at the time was Kingdom Hearts (2002), Nomura's directorial debut. The game was a collaboration between Square and The Walt Disney Company, blending Disney characters with Final Fantasy elements in an original story. Kingdom Hearts was also Shimomura's last project as an in-house composer before she left and went freelance in 2002.

A merger with rival company Enix had been under discussion since 2000, but Square's financial losses prompted Enix to halt discussions. Following the commercial success of Final Fantasy X and Kingdom Hearts, talks went ahead on the merger with Enix as Square's finances stabilized; Wada described it as a merger of two companies "at their height". Despite this, some shareholders had doubts about the merger, notably Miyamoto, who would find himself holding significantly less shares and having a smaller controlling stake if the deal went ahead as initially planned. Miyamoto's issue was resolved by altering the exchange ratio to one Square share for 0.81 Enix shares, and the merger was greenlit. The merger resulted in Square Enix being formed on April 1, 2003, with Enix as the surviving corporate entity and Square dissolving its departments and subsidiaries into the new company. Around 80% of Square's staff transitioned into Square Enix.

Structure

Development structure

During reports on the merger with Enix, Takashi Oya of Deutsche Securities described Square as  "[doing] everything by itself" compared to Enix's tradition of outsourcing development. During Square's first years, there was no set development structure, with the ten-person staff freely shifting between roles and projects. After the first couple of years, there were two loosely-defined production groups led by Sakaguchi and Tanaka respectively. Following the release of Final Fantasy IV, Sakaguchi divided the production team, assigning different staff members to the Final Fantasy, SaGa and Mana series. A secondary studio was founded in Osaka in 1990, with Final Fantasy Legend III (1991) as their first project.

By 1997, the company was divided into seven development divisions, expanded to eight that year with two based in Osaka. In 1998, the old development divisions were restructured into Production Departments, and the Osaka branch was closed down. The system was reshuffled again in 2002 to promote "greater understanding", and allow for reassignment between divisions. Among the heads of divisions at this time were Kitase, Kawazu, Tanaka, Matsuno and Hirata. Following the merger with Enix, the eight divisions were incorporated into the new company, with two additional divisions brought in from Enix.

Overseas publishing

The original Final Fantasy was published in North America in 1990 by Nintendo of America close to the launch of the Super Nintendo, resulting in its two NES sequels being passed over for localization at that time. Many other Square titles also remained exclusive to Japan, for reasons including design complexities, low graphical quality, and technical difficulties. Notable localization staff during the 1990s included Kaoru Moriyama, Ted Woolsey, Michael Basket, Richard Honeywood, and Alexander O. Smith.

Square's first Western branch, Square Soft, was established in 1989 in Redmond, Washington for publishing and development support. A second Western R&D subsidiary called Square LA was founded in 1995 in Marina del Rey, California, and was renamed Square USA in 1996.  In 1997, a second branch of Square USA was opened in Honolulu, Hawaii to focus on new interactive entertainment research. Square Europe was founded in 1998 in London, England, focusing on publishing in Europe. Square also partnered with several different distribution partners in Europe, including Crave Entertainment, Infogrames (later Atari Europe), and Ubisoft.

After opening their North American offices, Square began publishing selected titles under the "SquareSoft" brand. Square's presence in the West during the 1980s and 1990s was small; RPGs were not popular in the North American market, and Square's presence in Europe was limited. A notable third-party game localized and published by Square in North America was the original Breath of Fire, as developer Capcom had a busy schedule at the time. In the 1990s, Square's first six PlayStation releases were published by Sony.

On May 1, 1998, Square formed a North American and Japanese joint-venture partnership with Electronic Arts; the North American branch Square Electronic Arts published Square's titles in the region, while the Japanese branch Electronic Arts Square focused on PC releases from Electronic Arts. The partnership emerged the year following Electronic Arts winding down a similar partnership with Victor in December 1997. On February 19, 2003, to coincide with the Square Enix merger, Square announced that both ventures would cease operations in March, with the company certifying that the North American venture achieved the above-mentioned initial purpose of its establishment. Each partner purchased the other's shares. The Square Soft company itself remained, rebranded under the Square Enix name.

Subsidiaries and affiliates
Between 1986 and 1988, Square led a collective of game developers dedicated to the production of games for the Famicom Disk System. The Square-owned label, called Disk Original Group (DOG), included Square, HummingBirdSoft, System Sacom, Microcabin, Carry Lab, Thinking Rabbit and Xtalsoft. The coalition was formed to pool financial resources, as individual development for the then-small companies would have been potentially crippling. The Famicom Disk System was rendered defunct by 1988 due to increased storage capacity in standard Famicom ROM cartridges. 

In 1995, Square helped establish DreamFactory as an affiliate studio, which developed fighting-based titles for the PlayStation and PS2. DreamFactory became an independent company in 2001 after Square transferred their shares. A later subsidiary called Escape was established in March 1998 and featured staff from DreamFactory. It only produced Driving Emotion Type-S (2000) before being liquidated in 2003. The company held a stake in Bushido Blade developer Lightweight, until it was bought out by Genki.

A publishing brand called Aques was established by Square in 1996. Standing for "Advanced QUality Entertainment and Sports", and also acting as an anagram of Square's name, the brand was intended for publishing non-RPG titles such as sports games. That same year, DigiCube was also established. Founded by Square as a product distributor through convenience stores in Japan, it expanded into book publishing, stocked games from other companies, and at one point published games under its own brand. DigiCube survived the Square Enix merger, though it declared bankruptcy in 2004 after years of declining sales.

In 1999, Square created a number of subsidiaries with dedicated roles: Square Visual Works to focus on producing CGI animation, Square Sounds for music and sound effects, Squartz for quality control and user support, and Square Next to support smaller game projects. Following the success of Final Fantasy VII in 1997, Sakaguchi founded a dedicated CGI film studio called Square Pictures in Hawaii; his aim was to both develop The Spirits Within and help with further development of Square's CGI technology. Square Pictures produced only one more feature following The Spirits Within; a CGI short called "Final Flight of the Osiris" that later formed part of the 2003 anthology film The Animatrix. By the end of 2001, Square Pictures was dissolved and merged into Visual Works.

In 2002, Square Next was rebranded as The Game Designer Studio, with ownership between Square's Product Development Division 2 and Kawazu. The aim was to allow for development of games for Nintendo consoles without impacting production on Sony platform games. The Game Designers Studio was absorbed back into Square Enix after the completion of Crystal Chronicles, first renamed to SQEX Corporation and eventually dissolved entirely in 2010. Square Sounds was dissolved into the main company in March 2002 as an internal division, a move attributed to cost cutting. All the other subsidiaries were folded into Square Enix during the merger, with Visual Works becoming its own dedicated department.

Acquisitions 
In January 1994, Square acquired developer Cobra Team, turning it into a subsidiary called Solid and focusing their work on cooperating with external developers. G-Craft, developers of the Front Mission series, had a close relationship with Square due to their support of the property. Square bought out G-Craft and incorporated it in 1997 during production of Front Mission 2. In 2002, Ogre Battle developer Quest Corporation withdrew from game development and was bought by Square. Absorbed and repurposed into a production division, their first project was Final Fantasy Tactics Advance (2003).

Legacy
In a 2006 interview on the history of Square Enix, César A. Berardini of TeamXbox noted that many considered Final Fantasy VI to be one of the best RPGs and games of the 2D gaming era. In 1992, Nintendo's Shigeru Miyamoto noted the impact of Final Fantasy on Japanese role-playing games, stating Final Fantasys "interactive cinematic approach" with an emphasis on "presentation and graphics" was gradually becoming "the most common style" of Japanese RPG at the time. Makai Toushi SaGa was not only the first RPG developed for the Game Boy, but the first of Square's games to sell one million units.

The Final Fantasy series and several specific games within it have been credited for introducing and popularizing many concepts that are today widely used in console RPGs, both in story and gameplay. Final Fantasy VII for the PlayStation is attributed with boosting sales for the PlayStation console, and popularizing the RPG genre both for that platform and in general, after a prolonged lack of success outside Japan. In a 2012 interview article with Sakaguchi, Eurogamers Simon Parkin noted Square's legacy as being defined by the Final Fantasy series despite having developed multiple other notable series and games. Several of its standalone releases including Parasite Eve and Vagrant Story have also remained popular and well-remembered since their release.

Related studios
Several former Square staff members went on to found notable development studios and other ventures, sometimes working with Square Enix in later years. Kikuta, frustrated at the rigid hierarchy of Square, left and founded Sacnoth in 1997, which would become known for the Shadow Hearts series; he left Sacnoth in 1999 following the release of his project Koudelka and founded the music label Nostrilia. Takahashi and Tanaka, along with other Xenogears developers who wanted to work outside the Final Fantasy series, founded Monolith Soft in 1999 and went on to develop multiple projects, including further Xeno titles.

Nishi and a few others he knew founded several studios over the years including Love-de-Lic (Moon: Remix RPG Adventure), Skip Ltd. (Chibi-Robo!), and Punchline (Rule of Rose). Kameoka and other developers who worked on Legend of Mana (1999) founded Brownie Brown in 2000, and ended up working with Square Enix on the Mana series with Sword of Mana. Mizuno founded developer AlphaDream in 2000, with Fujioka joining soon after; the company is best known for its work on the Mario & Luigi series. Staff members from Square Pictures, including The Spirits Within co-director Motonori Sakakibara, established Sprite Animation Studios in Hawaii in 2002.

Sakaguchi, following a period of low morale after the failure of The Spirits Within, decided to re-enter game development. He founded Mistwalker in 2004, which has since produced series such as Blue Dragon and Terra Wars and standalone projects such as Lost Odyssey and The Last Story. After his resignation from Square, Takechi founded music label Dreamusic with Kazunaga Nitta. Both Mitsuda and Sakimoto formed independent music studios; Mitsuda formed Procyon so he could work while maintaining his health, while Sakimoto founded Basiscape to give himself freedom to work on a wider variety of projects.

References

Notes

Further reading

External links
Square Co., Ltd Official website (archives) Wayback Machine
Square Soft Inc Official website (archives)
Square USA Official website (archives)
History of Enix and Square (Square Enix's site) 

2003 mergers and acquisitions
Defunct video game companies of Japan
Japanese companies established in 1986
Japanese companies disestablished in 2003
Software companies based in Tokyo
 
Square Enix
Video game development companies
Video game publishers
Video game companies established in 1986
Video game companies disestablished in 2003